Silesian University may refer to:
 University of Silesia in Katowice — Poland
 Silesian University in Opava — Czech Republic
 Silesian University of Technology — Gliwice, Poland
 Medical University of Silesia in Katowice — Poland
 Schlesische [=Silesian] Friedrich-Wilhelms-Universität zu Breslau (before 1945) — now University of Wrocław, Poland